This is a list of ranches and sheep and cattle stations, organized by continent. Most of these are notable either for the large geographic area which they cover, or for their historical or cultural importance.

West Africa
Obudu Cattle Ranch
SODEPA cattle ranches in Cameroon

Australia
Station is the term used in Australia for large sheep or cattle properties.

New South Wales
Borrona Downs Station
Brindabella Station
Caryapundy Station
Cooplacurripa Station
Corona Station
Elsinora
Momba Station
Mount Gipps Station
Mount Poole Station
Mundi Mundi
Nocoleche
Oxley Station
Poolamacca Station
Salisbury Downs Station
Sturts Meadows Station
Thurloo Downs
Toorale Station
Uardry
Urisino
Yancannia Station

Northern Territory
Alexandria Station
Ambalindum
Alroy Downs
Amburla
Amungee Mungee
Andado
Angas Downs Indigenous Protected Area
Anthony Lagoon
Argadargada Station
Austral Downs
Auvergne Station
Ban Ban Springs Station
Banka Banka Station
Beetaloo
Bradshaw Station
Brunette Downs Station
Bullo River Station
Bunda Station
Camfield Station
Coniston Station
Coolibah Station
Crown Point Station
Curtin Springs
Deep Well Station
Delamere Station 
Dungowan Station
Elsey Station
Epenarra Station
Erldunda
Fish River Station (became a wildlife reserve)
Hamilton Downs Station
Helen Springs Station
Henbury Station
Horseshoe Bend Station
Inverway Station
Kalala Station
Killarney Station
Kirkimbie
La Belle Station
Lake Nash Station
Legune Station
Limbunya
Litchfield Station
Lucy Creek Station
Mallapunyah
Manners Creek Station
Marqua Station
Maryvale Station
Mittiebah Station
Moroak
Mount Bundy Station
Mount Doreen Station
Mount Ebenezer
Mount Riddock Station
Mount Sanford Station
Muckaty Station
Napperby Station
Narwietooma Station
Newcastle Waters Station
Newry Station
Pine Hill Station
Riveren
Rocklands Station
Stapleton Station
Supplejack Downs
Tanami Downs
Tanumbirini
The Garden Station
Tipperary Station
Tobermorey
Ucharonidge Station
Undoolya Station
Victoria River Downs Station
Walhallow Station
Wave Hill Station
Welltree
Wollogorang Station
Wongalara Sanctuary (previously Wongalara Station)
Yambah Station

Queensland
Adria Downs
Annandale Station
Aramac Station 
Arabella Station
Arrabury
Augustus Downs Station
Bexley Station
Boorara Station
Bowen Downs Station
Bulloo Downs Station
Canobie Station
Carandotta Station
Claraville Station
Connemara Station
Cooinda
Coorabulka
Cubbie Station
Currawilla
Dagworth Station
Davenport Downs Station
Delta Downs Station
Diamantina Lakes Station (became Diamantina National Park)
Dillalah
Dunbar Station
Durham Downs Station
Durrie Station
Elderslie Station
Esmeralda Station
Gipsy Plains
Glencoe Station
Glengyle Station
Glenormiston Station
Headingly Station
Iffley Station
Isis Downs Station
Jervoise Station
Kangerong Station
Kynuna Station
Marion Downs Station
Millungera Station
Mittagong Station
Morney Plains Station
Mount Margaret Station
Mywyn
Nappa Merrie
Naryilco
Natal Downs
Nockatunga Station
Palparara
Riversleigh Station
Rowanlea Station
South Galway Station
Strathmore Station
Tanbar Station
Thylungra
Tickalara
Valley of Lagoons Station
Warbreccan
Wellshot Station
Wondoola

South Australia
Alton Downs Station
Andamooka Station
Angepena
Angorichina
Anlaby Station
Anna Creek Station 
Arckaringa Station
Arcoona
Arkaba Station
Beltana
Billa Kalina
Bloods Creek Station
Bon Bon Reserve (previously Bon Bon Station)
Boolcoomatta Reserve (previously Boolcoomatta Station)
Bulgunnia Station
Bundaleer
Canowie Station
Carriewerloo
Clifton Hills Station
Collinsville Station
Commonwealth Hill Station
Cordillo Downs
Corunna Station
Cowarie Station
Dalhousie Station
Dulkaninna
Eringa Station
Hiltaba
Holowiliena Station
Innamincka Station
Kalamurina Sanctuary (previously Kalamurina Station)
Kanyaka Station
Kappawanta
Ketchowla Station
Kirkala
Koomooloo
Lambina
Macumba Station
Merty Merty Station
Mikkira
Moolawatana Station
Moolooloo
Moonaree
Mount Eba Station
Mount Ive
Mount Nor' West
Mount Victor Station
Mulgaria
Mulka Station
Muloorina
Mundowdna Station
Munduney
Mungeranie Station
Murnpeowie
Myrtle Springs Station
Nilpena
Nonning
Old Koomooloo
Oulnina
Pandie Pandie Station
Paney Station
Parakylia
Purple Downs
Quinyambie
Redcliffe Station
Roxby Downs Station
Stuart Creek Station
Talia Station
Tinga Tingana
Todmorden Station
Wallerberdina Station
Warrioota
Welbourne Hill Station
Wilgena Station
Winnowie
Wirrealpa
Witchelina
Wooltana Station
Woolundunga Station
Yardea

Victoria
Neds Corner Station
Wonnangatta Station
Wooloomanata Station

Western Australia

Abydos Station
Adelong Station
Albion Downs
Alice Downs
Anna Plains Station 
Annean Station
Argyle Downs
Arubiddy Station
Ashburton Downs
Atley Station
Austin Downs
Avondale Agricultural Research Station
Badja Station
Balfour Downs Station
Balgair
Balla Balla Station
Balline Station
Bandya Station
Banjawarn station
Barnong Station
Barwidgee Station
Bedford Downs Station
Beebyn Station
Belele Station
Beringarra Station
Bidgemia
Billabalong Station
Billiluna Station
Binthalya Station
Bonney Downs Station
Boodanoo Station
Boodarie Station
Boogardie Station
Boolaloo
Boolardy 
Boolathana Station
Boologooroo
Boonderoo
Bow River Station
Brick House Station
Brooking Springs
Bulga Downs Station
Bulloo Downs Station
Bunnawarra
Burnabbie
Byro Station
Callagiddy
Callawa Station
Cardabia
Carlton Hill Station
Charnley River Station
Cherrabun
Chirritta
Cobra Station
Cogla Downs Station
Coongan Station
Cooya Pooya
Corunna Downs Station
Credo Station
Croydon Station
De Grey Station
Doolgunna
Doorawarrah
Drysdale River Station
Edjudina
El Questro Wilderness Park 
Ellenbrae
Emu Creek Station
Erlistoun
Ethel Creek Station
Ettrick Station
Exmouth Gulf Station
Fossil Downs Station
Fraser Range Station
Gabyon Station
Giralia
Glenflorrie
Glenorn
Glenroy Station
Globe Hill Station
Gnaraloo
Gogo Station
Hamersley Station
Hooley Station
Ivanhoe Station
Jimba Jimba Station
Juna Downs
Kadji Kadji
Kalli Station
Karbar Station
Kimberley Downs
Kinclaven Station
Kirkalocka
Kooline
Koordarrie
Korong Station
Lake Way Station
Lake Wells Station
Lalla Rookh Station
Landor Station
Lansdowne Station
Laverton Downs
Leinster Downs
Liveringa
Louisa Downs Station
Madura Station
Mallina Station
Mandora Station 
Mardie Station
Maroonah
Marillana
Marrilla
Meda Station
Meedo
Meka Station
Melangata Station
Mertondale Station
Middalya Station
Mileura Station
Millstream Station
Milly Milly
Minara Station
Minderoo Station
Minilya Station
Moola Bulla
Moorarie Station
Mornington Station
Mount Augustus Station
Mount Barnett Station
Mount Celia Station
Mount Clere Station
Mount Edgar Station
Mount Elizabeth Station
Mount Elvire Station
Mount Florence Station
Mount Gould Station
Mount Hart Station
Mount House Station
Mount Keith Station
Mount Minnie Station
Mount Narryer
Mount Vernon Station
Mount Welcome Station
Muccan Station
Mulga Downs Station
Mundrabilla Station
Murgoo Station
Murrum Station
Myroodah
Nambi
Nanutarra Station
Napier Downs
Ningaloo Station
Noonkanbah Station
Nookawarra Station
Noreena Downs Station
Nyang Station
Pardoo Station
Paroo Station
Peedamulla
Pilga Station
Pippingarra
Pinnacles Station
Prairie Downs
Prenti Downs
Pyramid Station
Quanbun Downs Station
Quobba
Rawlinna Station
Rocklea Station
Roebuck Plains Station
Ruby Plains Station
Sherlock Station
Springvale Station
Sturt Meadows Station
Tangadee
Tarmoola Station
Three Rivers Station
Thundelarra
Tibradden Station
Turee Creek Station
Uaroo
Ullawarra
Wallal
Warrawagine
Warroora
Windidda
Wonganoo
Wooleen Station
Wooramel Station
Wyloo
Yakabindie
Yanrey
Yardie Creek Station
Yarrabubba
Yarragadee Station
Yarraquin
Yarraloola
Yarrie Station
Yeeda Station
Yeelirrie Station
Yerilla Station
Yuin Station
Yuinmery
Youanmi Downs
Yundamindera Station

New Zealand
Run or station is the term used in New Zealand for large sheep or cattle properties.
 Akitio 
 Brancepeth Station
 Castle Hill
 Double Hill Station, located on the Rakaia River
 Erewhon (a fictitious station; see Mesopotamia Station)
 Flock Hill
 Glenaray Station
 Maraekakaho
 Marainanga
 Matanaka Farm
 Mesopotamia Station
 Molesworth Station
 St James Station (became conservation land)
 Terawhiti Station
 Walter Peak Station
 Mount Nicholas Station

North America

Canada
Douglas Lake Ranch
Gang Ranch
Bar U Ranch
OH Ranch

United States
6666 Ranch
A. S. Gage Ranch
Adams Ranch
Allen Ranch (dissolved)
Babcock Ranch
Bell Ranch
Big Rack Ranch
Conaway Ranch
Cotton Mesa Trophy Whitetail Raanch
David L. Shirk Ranch
Deseret Ranches
Eight Point Ranch
Flying W Ranch
Grant-Kohrs Ranch National Historic Site
Hardware Ranch
Harris Ranch
Hidden Hills Ranch
Hollister Ranch
Imus Ranch
Iron Side Ranch
JA Ranch
Kenedy Ranch
Keys Desert Queen Ranch
King Ranch
La Escalera Ranch
Latigo Ranch
Lee's Ferry and Lonely Dell Ranch
Michaelis Ranch
Miller Brothers 101 Ranch
Parker Ranch
Philmont Scout Ranch
Pitchfork Ranch
Prairie Chapel Ranch
Rancho Santa Margarita y Las Flores (became Marine Corps Base Camp Pendleton)
Roba Ranch
SLW Ranch
Santa Rosa Ranch
Snake River Ranch
Southfork Ranch
Spade Ranch (Nebraska)
Spade Ranch (Texas) (dissolved)
TA Ranch Historic District
Tejon Ranch
Vermejo Park Ranch
Waggoner Ranch
Whitehorse Ranch
XIT Ranch in Texas

South America
Dadanawa Ranch
Estancia Harberton
Finca Los Alamos
Hacienda Nápoles

See also
Cattle station
Estancia
Guest ranch
Hacienda
Movie ranch
Sheep station
Station (Australian agriculture)
Station (New Zealand agriculture)
List of historic ranches in British Columbia
List of the largest stations in Australia

References

Stations (Australian agriculture)